Makushino is the name of several inhabited localities in Russia.

Urban localities
Makushino, Kurgan Oblast, a town in Makushinsky District of Kurgan Oblast

Rural localities
Makushino, Novgorod Oblast, a village in Yedrovskoye Settlement of Valdaysky District in Novgorod Oblast
Makushino, Pskov Oblast, a village in Opochetsky District of Pskov Oblast